Bevan Small (born 24 February 1992) is a New Zealand cricketer who plays for Central Districts. In June 2018, he was awarded a contract with Central Districts for the 2018–19 season.

Small, while fielding as the 12th man in January 2012 during the New Zealand domestic HRV Twenty20 competition (currently known as the Super Smash) as a 19-year-old, made a spectacular catch assist on the boundary line. The catch was completed by teammate Michael Mason. The Laws of Cricket indicate that a catch can be initiated outside of the boundary line so long as the player is airborne whenever they are touching the ball; this must remain so until the ball is back inside the boundary (either completed by the same player or, as was the case with Small, completed by a teammate). The West Australian thought it was a candidate for the "greatest cricket catch ever", while a commentator during the match called it "possibly the most brilliant piece of fielding I've ever seen". The video has received millions of views across various online uploads.

References

External links
 

1992 births
Living people
New Zealand cricketers
Central Districts cricketers
People from Feilding